This is a list of Afghan Armed Forces bases and installations used by the Afghan Air Force (AAF) and the Afghan National Army (ANA).

Air bases

Installations and other facilities

See also
 List of airports in Afghanistan
 List of NATO installations in Afghanistan

References

External links
 Afghan Ministry of Defense

installations